Atelopus barbotini, popularly known as the purple fluorescent frog or more accurately the purple harlequin toad, is a species of toad in the family Bufonidae.

General Information

The toad was formerly considered part of the Atelopus spumarius.  It is not clear whether or not it is a single species or a group of related species.  In the past the species has also been called Atelopus flavescens.

Several publications have touched on the subject of Atelopus barbotini.  In 2005 Noonan and Gaucher wrote in Molecular Ecology that there was evidence that Atelopus barbotini might not be conspecific with Atelopus spumarius.  They didn't make a change to the taxology of the species though.  In 2011 Lötters, van der Meijden, et al. argued that Atelopus barbotini and Atelopus spumarius were not conspecific, but that Atelopus flavescens may be conspecific with Atelopus barbotini.

Size

Atelopus barbotini are a smaller species of toad only reaching approximately 2.5cm for males and 3.5cm for females as adults. 

Range

It is endemic to the uplands of central French Guiana. Usually seen above elevations of 

Reasons for Decline in Population

Deforestation and disease are the main causes for population decline in recent years. Because French Guyana has few laws and restrictions for logging, there are often issues with sustaining enough range for the toads to maintain a steady population.

References

External links
 Atelopus barbotini on AmphibiaWeb
 Atelopus barbotini on Wikispecies

barbotini
Amphibians of French Guiana
Endemic fauna of French Guiana
Amphibians described in 1981